PNI  may refer to:

Organizations 
 Indonesian National Party (Partai Nasional Indonesia), the name used by several political parties in Indonesia
 Palestinian National Initiative, a Palestinian political party
 PNI Digital Media (Photochannel Networks Inc), a US company that operates an on-demand photographic printing service
 United Nations Crime Prevention and Criminal Justice Programme Network, a global research- and information-sharing network

Science 
 Perineural invasion, cancer spreading along a nerve
 Psychoneuroimmunology, the study of interaction between the nervous system and immune system

Technology 
 Prescott New Instructions, also known as SSE3, an instruction set introduced with the Intel Prescott processor in 2004
 Private Network Interconnect, a method of Internet peering

Places 
 PNI, IATA Airport Code for Pohnpei International Airport in Micronesia